"They Don't Make 'em Like My Daddy" is a single by American country music artist Loretta Lynn. Released in April 1974, it was the first single from her album They Don't Make 'em Like My Daddy. The song peaked at number 4 on the Billboard Hot Country Singles chart. It also reached number 1 on the RPM Country Tracks chart in Canada.

Chart performance

References

1974 singles
Loretta Lynn songs
Songs written by Jerry Chesnut
Song recordings produced by Owen Bradley
Decca Records singles
1974 songs